is a Prefectural Natural Park in southwest Aomori Prefecture, Japan.

Gorges and waterfalls are the main feature of this national park.

See also
 National Parks of Japan

References

Parks and gardens in Aomori Prefecture
Ajigasawa, Aomori
Protected areas established in 1981
1981 establishments in Japan